Bulgaria competed at the 2014 Winter Paralympics in Sochi, Russia, held between 7–16 March 2014. It fielded a total of two athletes, both of whom competed in cross-country skiing. It did not win a medal.

Cross-country skiing 

Men

See also
Bulgaria at the Paralympics
Bulgaria at the 2014 Winter Olympics

References

Nations at the 2014 Winter Paralympics
2014
Winter Paralympics